Mark Otis Selby (September 2, 1961 – September 18, 2017) was an American blues rock singer-songwriter, guitarist, multi-instrumentalist, and record producer. Born in Enid, Oklahoma, he was a solo artist, signed to ZYX Records in Europe, and one half of performing duo with his wife, songwriter Tia Sillers. He also played guitar in recording sessions for musical artists such as Kenny Rogers, Johnny Reid, Keni Thomas, Jimmy Hall, and Wynonna Judd.

Selby is perhaps best known for the number of songs that he co-wrote with the blues-rock artist Kenny Wayne Shepherd which includes the No. 1 single, "Blue on Black". This song was also Billboard magazine rock track of the year in 1998. Selby also collaborated with Sillers on the No. 1 song, "There's Your Trouble" and won the band their first Grammy Award for Best Country Performance by a Duo or Group with Vocal in 1999.

Selby released a number of solo albums over his career. The first two projects, More Storms Comin''' and Dirt were on Vanguard Records.  After signing with ZYX in Merenberg, Germany, he released his next album, Mark Otis Selby And The Horse He Rode In On. This all-acoustic release featured Selby's 1974 Mossman guitar and spurred a broad audience in Germany and Switzerland. His most recent project, Blue Highway, was released in 2013. He has worked with the Grammy winning record producer Brent Maher on 5 of his projects.

In 2016, Selby was inducted into the Kansas Music Hall Of Fame.

Besides the Mossman, he played a modified 1990s Fender Relic Nocaster, a Fender Rory Gallagher Fender Stratocaster, and a 1944 Gibson J-45. As for amplifiers, he described himself as "a Fender guy."

Selby died on September 18, 2017, from cancer.

Influences
When asked to describe some of his influences, he noted, "When I was younger, I really got into an Eric Clapton anthology that had a cross selection of songs he was well known for, and some spontaneous jams with Jimmy Page and Muddy Waters. There was so much emotion and a big slice of life in those songs performed by the old blues players...Billy Gibbons was also a very big influence...He had a great way of synthesizing a lot of great styles and making it his own."

Select discography
Albums
1984: One way ticket1986: One of these days1990: Wheatfield Boogie (Mark Selby & The Sluggers)
2000: More Storms Comin'2003: Dirt2006: Mark Otis Selby And The Horse He Rode In On2008: Nine Pound Hammer2009: Live at Rockpalast - One Night In Bonn2013: Blue Highway2018: Naked SessionsCompilation albums
2001: Avalon Blues: A Tribute To The Music Of Mississippi John Hurt2007: Mark Selby's Nashville Picks! (Vol. 1)2014: Mark Selby: The Box Set" 
2017: One Night With Mark Selby

Singles written by Selby

References

External links

[ Biography by Alex Henderson] for Allmusic 
Mark Selby on creativity, style and guitar tone for The Tone Quest Report
Sillers & Selby Songwriting Partners for The Tennessean
Singer-Songwriter Mark Selby Dies for MusicRow
Mark Selby Bio for Loan Star Music
Dirt for No Depression

1960s births
2017 deaths
Deaths from cancer in Tennessee
American rock singers
American male singers
American rock guitarists
American male guitarists
American multi-instrumentalists
Record producers from Oklahoma
Vanguard Records artists
20th-century American guitarists
Musicians from Enid, Oklahoma
20th-century American male musicians